Svirsky (feminine: Svirskaya) is a Russian-language toponymic surname literally meaning "of Svir"/"from Svir".  Another transliteration is Swirsky. The Polish-language equivalent is Świrski.

Notable people with this surname include:
Grigory Svirsky
Alexander Svirsky

Russian-language surnames
Toponymic surnames